Alex Kelly is a fictional character on the FOX television series The O.C., portrayed by Olivia Wilde. She is bisexual, dating both Seth Cohen and Marissa Cooper in the second season of the series.

Characterization and background

Conception
Creator Josh Schwartz described Alex as "the bad girl who runs the Bait Shop, which is the new club the kids are going to be hanging out at where all these bands will be performing at. She's our "Nat" (Beverly Hills 90210), if you will."

Background
Alex is the resident bad girl in the show. In season 2, she reveals to Seth that she was expelled from the Mater Dei School in Santa Ana (a Catholic school) and Newport Union High School, the local public school in Newport.

Character history

Season 2
When Seth needed tickets to The Walkmen show for Summer and Zach, in an attempt at friendship, he goes to The Bait Shop to buy them. He asks Alex and she says that the show is sold out and that he'd have to work there to get tickets, and ends up hiring him. Seth convinces her to go on a date with Ryan ("The New Era"), with himself and Lindsay joining to make it a double date. It turns out that Ryan and Alex have very little in common, and when the date is over Seth goes back to The Bait Shop and apologizes to her for the horrible night, in which she replies that he's bratty and immature, but also charming. She says there is hope for him yet, and Seth asks her to go for ice cream. She kisses him on the stairs as they leave, and share ice cream on the pier.

Seth invites her to the SnO.C. dance, she declines and tells him that he got the wrong idea out of the kiss. The same night, Zach appears at the Bait Shop for a drink. While there, he asks Alex for advice on Summer, oblivious to the fact that Alex actually knows Seth and Summer. She advises him to fight for Summer, otherwise she'll never fall for him. At the end of the conversation, she realizes that Zach is talking about Seth and Summer's relationship, and seems to contemplate making a move of her own. Alex shows up at the dance, and takes care of Seth after Zach punches him, and they end up sharing a kiss at the Bait Shop where they've gone to get a first aid kit. As their relationship has progressed, Seth keeps trying to impress her by being a "bad boy" by getting drunk and stealing Caleb's car. Upon realizing what Seth is doing Alex tells him that she's been with a lot of bad boys, and that he's just not one of them. She then proceeds to tell him that she likes him because he's a good guy. When Sandy, Seth's dad, shows up at the Bait Shop he asks her to tell Seth that they cannot see each other because Seth will not listen to him, as Sandy thinks Alex is a bad influence on Seth. When Seth ends up coming by the Bait Shop after sneaking out she tells him that his dad came by for a visit, and that she needs to do the right thing and not see him for a while. This doesn't last long as Alex then helps Seth and Sandy throw a surprise anniversary party for Kirsten, and they then approve of her. The good doesn't last long though; when Alex's ex-girlfriend, Jody, shows up in town it causes a strain between Seth and her and they decide to break up, and she apologizes for the incident.

Alex and Marissa start to watch a horror movie the night she and Seth broke up. When they decide that they are cold, Alex reaches over Marissa to pull a blanket over them. As she leans over and pulls back, they share a glance at one another, and it is something Marissa has never experienced before. Alex and Marissa become very close over the next while, and when Alex's ex-girlfriend will not let her leave her house, Marissa gets her out of it by saying that she and Alex are dating. The next day, Alex then questions why they hang out so much, which ended up hurting Marissa's feelings. Later on, though, at The Bait Shop, Alex is listening to Rachael Yamagata sing a sultry tune when Marissa approaches her from behind and takes her hand, weaving their fingers together. They exchange smiles. On Valentine's Day, Marissa goes to see Alex at the Bait Shop after an awful dinner with Julie Cooper. Alex then asks Marissa if she's in the mood for the beach, which is where they share their first kiss. Alex then feels that Marissa is embarrassed by her because she won't tell anyone about them, but Marissa then tells her best friend Summer, making her happy. In the episode The Rainy Day Women, Marissa moves in with Alex. However, Alex and Marissa end up experiencing some problems in their relationship, mainly because of her jealousy towards Ryan. They later break up ("The Blaze of Glory"), which leaves Alex feeling devastated, prompting her to decide that she wants to go back home and return to high school.

Alex appears in 13 episodes throughout the second season. She stated in the first episode that she appeared in (The New Kids on the Block) that she had attended (and got expelled from) numerous public schools in the surrounding areas. It's then revealed in a later episode (The Accomplice) that she had got emancipated from her parents; having done this, she dropped out of high school, got a job at The Bait Shop and moved into an apartment on the numeric streets of Newport Beach.

References

The O.C. characters
Fictional bartenders
Fictional bisexual females
Fictional characters from Orange County, California
Television characters introduced in 2004
Fictional managers
Fictional LGBT characters in television
American female characters in television